Grace Episcopal Church, located at 1000 Leighton Avenue in Anniston, Alabama, is an historic Gothic Revival church that was added to the National Register of Historic Places on November 3, 1985.

See also

National Register of Historic Places listings in Calhoun County, Alabama

References

External links
 Grace Episcopal Church website

National Register of Historic Places in Calhoun County, Alabama
Churches on the National Register of Historic Places in Alabama
Episcopal church buildings in Alabama
Gothic Revival church buildings in Alabama
Churches in Calhoun County, Alabama
Churches completed in 1885
1885 establishments in Alabama